Khartoum State is one of the eighteen states of Sudan. Although it is the smallest state by area (22,142 km2), it is the most populous (5,274,321 in 2008 census). It contains the country's largest city by population, Omdurman, and the city of Khartoum, which is the capital of the state as well as the national capital of Sudan. The capital city contains offices of the state, governmental and non-governmental organizations, cultural institutions, and the main airport.

The city is located in the heart of Sudan at the confluence of the White Nile and the Blue Nile, where the two rivers unite to form the River Nile. The confluence of the two rivers creates a unique effect. As they join, each river retains its own color: the White Nile with its bright whiteness and the Blue Nile with its alluvial brown color. These colors are more visible in the flood season.

The state lies between longitudes 31.5 to 34°E and latitudes 15 to 16°N. It is surrounded by River Nile State in the north-east, in the north-west by the Northern State, in the east and southeast by the states of Kassala, Qadarif, Gezira and White Nile State, and in the west by North Kurdufan.

Etymology
There are several etymologies for the name of Khartoum. The explanation suggested as "most correct" by the state government's website is that it comes from the Arabic for "elephant's trunk", which describes the shape of the site of the city at the confluence of the two Niles, where a stretch of land extends into the water. Other stories are that it is a corruption of "gurtoum", the name for seeds of the sunflower plant, supposedly used by Roman invaders at the current site of Khartoum to treat soldiers' wounds, or that it was derived from the words "Khor al-Tom".

Climate
The northern region of the state is mostly desert because it receives barely any rainfall, whereas the other regions have semi-desert climates. The weather is rainy in the fall, and cold and dry in the winter.

Localities
Khartoum has Seven Localities 
Khartoum (Capital)
Omdurman
Khartoum North
Sharq an-Nīl
Jabal Awliya
Om Badda
Karari

Population and economy
The 2008 population census estimates the population of Khartoum state to be about 5,274,321 capita, composed of various tribes of the Sudan. The population is 79% urban, and 74% of the state's population reported their region of origin to be outside Khartoum.

The areas of Omdurman and the rural South are inhabited by the tribe of Gamowia, as well as by the Kordofani tribes displaced to these areas by the drought and desertification that hit their areas in the early- and mid-1980s. These are the tribes of the Kababish and the Kawahla. In the northern countryside of Karari locality are the tribe of Shiheinat, and in Khartoum North the tribes of Abdallab and Batahin. In the East Nile are the tribes of Abu Dileig, Batahin, and Kawahla, with the tribe of Iseilat in Um-Dowan.

Most of the population works in government service, the private sector, and banking. There is also a large number of merchants, and migrants and displaced people working in marginal activities. In the countryside most people are engaged in agriculture and grazing and thus supply the capital, Khartoum, with vegetables, fruits, and dairy products. There are also some residents living on the banks of the rivers engaged in the trades dependent on the rivers, such as pottery, brick-making and fishing. Above all stands the strong ambition to become the new Dubai with the financial support coming from the oil and gas supplies of the country.
The State of Khartoum is now the largest center in Sudan for the manufacturing sector with more than 7500 different factories and more than ten industrial areas providing all types of goods such as food processing and electronics and household appliances as well as medicines and textiles as well as footwear and tanneries and chemicals. Within the next year five Chinese car manufacturers will start operations to make Khartoum a hub for vehicle manufacturing in Africa..

Museums and archeological sites
Khartoum state contains archaeological sites dating back to different periods of civilization, both prehistoric and historical. Its museums include the largest in Sudan, the National Museum of Sudan, and a number of specialized museums, such as the Khalifa House Museum and the Museums of Natural History, Folklore and the Popular Heritage. There are also a center for study of folklore under the National Authority for the Arts, and the Omdurman Museum of Ibrahim Hijazi.

See also
2007 Sudan floods
Schools in Khartoum
Universities in Sudan
Hotels in Khartoum

References

 
States of Sudan
Khartoum